Nawab Mir Yousaf Aziz Magsi was a co-founder of the Anjuman-e-Ittehad-e-Balochan-wa-Balochistan alongside Abdul Aziz Kurd. In 2011, a commemorative seminar was held at the National Language Authority in Islamabad.

See also
 Baloch
 Balochistan
 Zulfikar Ali Magsi
 Ataullah Mengal
 Mir Gul Khan Naseer
 Khair Bakhsh Marri
 Balach Marri

References

Baloch nationalists
Nawabs of Balochistan, Pakistan
People from Jhal Magsi District
Yousaf Aziz
Tumandars
Baloch people
1908 births
1935 deaths
Nawabs of Pakistan